Mawlai is a census town in East Khasi Hills district in the Indian state of Meghalaya.

Demographics
 India census, Mawlai had a population of 38,241. Males constitute 48% of the population and females 52%. Mawlai has an average literacy rate of 73%, higher than the national average of 59.5%: male literacy is 74%, and female literacy is 72%. In Mawlai, 16% of the population is under 6 years of age.

Religion

Most of the people in the town follow Christianity, with significant followers of Hinduism and a small Muslim population.

References

East Khasi Hills district
Cities and towns in East Khasi Hills district